The Ming-Ai (London) Institute (simplified: 明爱(伦敦)学院; traditional: 明愛(倫敦)學院; pinyin: Míng'ài (Lúndūn) Xuéyuàn) is the executive arm of the Ming-Ai Association, established in 1993 to promote Chinese culture locally and deliver cultural exchanges between the UK and Greater China.

Operating from Denver House near Bounds Green tube station, the Ming-Ai (London) Institute offers a number of short courses and delivers a range of undergraduate and postgraduate courses in Memorandum with Middlesex University.

The Ming-Ai (London) Institute hosts and exhibits information about British Chinese cultural Heritage through the British Chinese Heritage Centre (simplified: 英国华人文化传承中心; traditional: 英國華人文化傳承中心; pinyin: Yīngguó Huárén Wénhuà Chuánchéng Zhōngxīn), a cyber centre dedicated to on-going and past heritage projects conducted by the Ming-Ai (London) Institute.

The institute has also delivered a variety of professional and vocational courses which include the following: languages, including Japanese, Cantonese and, Mandarin; hospitality; including Food Hygiene (CIEH), BIIAB National Certificate Personal Licence Holder (NCPLH), Cookery in Chinese and Oriental Style and Dimsum Taster Days; leisure, Tai Chi (simplified: 太极, pinyin: Tàijí), Piano, Chinese Painting, Chinese Calligraphy; and others including the Life in the UK - British Citizenship Test.

Therese Wai Han Shak 
Theresa Wai Han Shak (Chinese name: 石慧嫻) is the founder of the Ming-Ai (London) Institute. Theresa's origins in Mainland China, inherited wealth, connections to the Catholic Church and passion for contemporary education allowed Shak to become highly influential in educational reform and UK-China relations. Understanding her journey and mission provides insights to the institutes origins and purpose.

Projects 
To fulfill the mission of the Ming-Ai (London) Institute numerous projects have been delivered towards cultural exchange between the UK and China and promote Chinese culture locally. Typically projects include a number of oral histories which form the basis for a series of research publications, community events, training events and workshops. The training of volunteers and staff is an important measure of success for each project. The institute is currently a placement partner of Goldsmiths, University of London.

British Chinese Armed Forces Heritage 
Funded by the Heritage Lottery Fund, British Chinese Armed Forces (simplified: 华籍英军史; traditional: 華籍英軍史; pinyin: Huájíyīng Jūnshǐ) is an ongoing project launched in June 2015. The project is a four-year undertaking in collaboration with Regent's University London for the creation of a cultural-historical archive documenting the contributions made by people of Chinese descent to the British Armed Forces. In partnership with the National Army Museum, the institute will collect the stories about historical items. The project has been mentioned in The Huffington Post.

Interviews

Elizabeth Mary Ride 
Elizabeth Ride provided the Ming-Ai (London) Institute with her account of her father, Sir Lindsay Ride's career in British Hong Kong with the British Army. The recording which has been archived at the British Chinese Heritage Centre also speaks of how Ride came to form the British Army Aid Group.

Brigadier Norman Allen 
A Brigadier previously stationed in Hong Kong.

Brigadier Christopher Hammerbeck 
Brigadier Christopher Hammerbeck a former Deputy Commander and Chief of Staff of British Forces Overseas Hong Kong.

Commodore Peter Melson

British Chinese Workforce Heritage 
Funded by the Heritage Lottery Fund, British Chinese Work Force Heritage (英國華人職業傳承史) was a three-year project launched in 2012 with provision to explore the contributions made by British Chinese to the London workforce over the past 150 years during which Ming-Ai (London) Institute trained 12 interns, published 89 oral histories and five articles in partnership with the City of London, Haringey Council, London Metropolitan Archives, Islington Heritage, National Army Museum, Regent's University London, Horniman Museum & Gardens, St Micheal's Catholic College, University College London, Middlesex University London, K&L Gates and City of Westminster Libraries. The British Chinese Workforce Heritage project was written about in the South China Morning Post.

British Chinese Food Culture 
Funded by the Heritage Lottery Fund, the British Chinese Food Culture  (英國中餐文化) project was launched in 2011 in order to identify the changes in British Chinese cuisine from the original recipes derived from Greater China. A key focus is how the availability of ingredients caused Chinese restaurants to adapt their dishes and explores how the reintroduction of original ingredients allows restaurants to deliver greater authenticity.

Healthy Chinese Cuisine Ambassadors 
From 2016 the new GCSE in Food Preparation & Nutrition will be taught in British schools. In preparation the Ming-Ai (London) Institute in partnership with Chinese manufacturer Lee Kum Kee founded a project to promote Chinese cuisine in British schools. The project will last for five years with the objective of reaching 280 schools and conduct 40 or more teacher training workshops.

East West Festive Culture 
Funded by the Heritage Lottery Fund, East West Festive Culture (東西文化節慶) was a two-year project which started in October 2008. The project aimed to explore analogous festivals in Western and Chinese cultures. Tracing 150 years' of British Chinese festive celebration in London the project cast light on a three demographics. Firstly Chinese people who emigrated to the UK in their early life, secondly couples with a non-Chinese partner and finally British born Chinese. Each of these groups was selected to shed light to both the contrast and similarities between Eastern and Western culture.

The Evolution and History of British Chinese Workforce 
In October 2009 the Ming-Ai (London) Institution used funding from UK Government Transformation Fund to undertake The Evolution and History of British Chinese Workforce (英國華人職業演變史) project. This was the second oral histories project undertaken by the Ming-Ai (London) Institute.

Making Chinese Votes Count   
Funded by the Electoral Commission the Making Chinese Votes Count project was managed by a consortium consisting of both the Ming-Ai (London) Institute and the London Chinese Community Network (LCCN). The 12-month project started in January 2006 with provision to improve the representation of Chinese people in the UK Government. Within the project a series of community workshops were delivered covering topics such as electoral law, political participation, how to become involved in politics. Around 180 people of which 56% of whom were of Chinese descent attended a series of four workshops through the course of the project.

Associate College of Middlesex University 
In 1995 the institution joined resources with Middlesex University to develop a number of China-related courses. The Ming-Ai (London) Institute delivers postgraduate courses in Chinese Cultural Heritage Management leading to either MA, PG Dip and PG Cert qualification which are awarded by Middlesex University.

The Ming-Ai (London) Institute also facilitated negotiations between Middlesex University and Beijing University of Chinese Medicine and Pharmacology leading to the establishment in 1997 of their joint five-year Degree programme, B.Sc. (Hons) in Traditional Chinese Medicine for which the Ming-Ai (London) Institute provides Mandarin training for the programme.

Domestic activities 
The institute has established relationships with many UK institutions and community groups with whom the Ming-Ai (London) Institute has collaborated in joint ventures toward the aim of forging closer ties Greater China, British Chinese communities and the rest of Great Britain.

Network of UK Higher Education Institutions 
Links with UK Institutions of higher education have allowed the institute to recruit on China's behalf, UK graduates to teach overseas. Furthermore, the institute has helped UK institutions to recruit students from across Greater China by giving lecturers an opportunity to teach in Chinese institutions. In 2008 the institution had contacts across 13 Chinese provinces.

UK Institutions in the Ming-Ai (London) Institute's Education Network

1992–2002 
 Berkshire College of Agriculture
 Birmingham College of Food, Tourism and Creative Studies
 Bloomsbury Education
 Broxtowe College
 Calderdale College Corporation
 Cambridge Regional College
 Derby College
 Gateshead College
 Guildford College
 Hopwood Hall College
 Leeds English Language School
 Nescot
 Northumbria University
 Notre Dame Catholic Sixth Form College

2002–2012 
 Regent's University London
 University College London
 Goldsmiths, University of London

International Activities 
The institute organizes Education Missions across Greater China in order to link UK academics to their counterparts in China. Each mission may pertain to conferences, seminars and workshops with the intention of strengthening UK-China relations in the sphere of education. Hosts have included prestigious Chinese institutions of higher education including Peking University, Jilin University, Wuhan University and Sichuan University.

Institutions in Greater China visited by the Ming-Ai (London) Institute

1992–2002 
 Adult Education College of Chengdu
 Anhui Administration Institute
 Anhui Economic Management Cadres Institute
 Anhui Education Commission
 Anhui Management Development Center
 Anhui Provincial People's Government 
 Anhui Provincial Planning Commission 
 Anhui University 
 Art Gallery of Anhui Province  
 Beijing 21 Century Experimental School 
 Beijing Adult Education College 
 Beijing Association of Adult Education  
 Beijing College of Traditional Chinese Medicine 
 Beijing Higher Education Development Center for Science and Technology 
 Beijing Industry University 
 Beijing Institute of Tourism 
 Beijing ISS International School International Education Center 
 Beijing Jingshan School 
 Beijing Language and Culture University 
 Beijing No.2 Experimental Primary School 
 Beijing Normal University No.2 Middle School  
 Beijing Normal University: The First Middle School 
 Beijing Union University 
 Beijing University 
 Beijing University of Traditional Chinese Medicine 
 Cartias Chan Chun Ha Field Studies Centre 
 Cartias Francis Hsu College 
 Central Institute of Finance and Banking 
 Changchun University 
 Chengdu Adult Education College 
 Chengdu Chinese Medicine University 
 Chengdu College of Education 
 Chengdu Education Commission 
 Chengdu University 
 China Textile University 
 Chinese Academy of Agricultural Sciences 
 Chinese Academy of Science 
 Chinese Educational Association for International Exchange 
 Chongqing University 
 Chongqing University of Medical Science 
 Dalian Zhongshan District Peizhi School 
 Central Institute of Finance and Accounting, Department of Accounting 
 Department of Foreign Affairs State Administration of Traditional Chinese Medicine 
 Development Centre for Teaching Chinese as a Foreign Language Under the Ministry of Education  
 Development Centre for Teaching Chinese as a Foreign Language Under the State Education Commission 
 Education Commission of Gansu Province 
 Education Commission of Guangxi Zhuang Autonomous Region 
 Education Department of Hainan Province 
 Employees Retraining Board 
 Foreign Affairs and Friendship Commission of Guangxi, CPPCC 
 Foshan Education Committee 
 Foshan University 
 Fudan University  
 Guangdong Administration College 
 Guangdong Association of Public Administration 
 Guangdong Commercial College 
 Guangdong Higher Education Bureau 
 Guangxi Agriculture University 
 Guangxi Committee, CPPCC 
 Guangxi Education Association for International Exchanges 
 Guangxi Educational Newspaper  
 Guangxi Infantile Paralysis Orthopedic Centre
 Guangxi Radio and TV University
 Guangxi Teachers University
 Guangxi University
 Guangxi University for Nationalities
 Guangxi Zhuang Autonomous Region's Committee of the Chinese People's Political Consultative Conference
 Guangzhou Adult Education Association
 Guangzhou Education College
 Guangzhou Education Committee
 Guangzhou Educational and International Exchange Association
 Guangzhou Huamei International School
 Guangzhou Medical College
 Guangzhou People's Municipal Government
 Guangzhou Radio and Television University
 Guangzhou Teacher's College
 Guangzhou Television and Broadcasting University
 Guangzhou University
 Guangzhou University of Chinese Medicine
 Guangzhou Vocational University
 Guilin Committee of the Chinese People's Political Consultative Conference
 Guilin CPPCC Liaison Committee
 Guilin Institute of Technology
 Guilin Social Welfare Centre
 Guizhou Institute of Technology
 Guizhou Social Welfare Centre
 Guizhou Daily
 Guizhou Education College
 Guizhou Education Commission
 Guizhou Province Tourist Department
 Guizhou Provincial Education Commission
 Guizhou Provincial Municipal Government
 Guizhou Radio and Television University
 Haikou Tourists Vocational School
 Hainan Province Education and Science Research Institute
 Hainan University
 Hainan University Library
 Harbin Normal University 
 Hefei Normal University 
 Hefei Union University
 Hefei University of Technology
 Heilongjiang Bureau of Foreign Experts
 Heilongjiang College of Commercial
 Heilongjiang Education Commission
 Heilongjiang Medical Academy
 Heilongjiang University
 Higher Education Bureau of Guangdong Province
 Hong Kong & Macao Office State Council People's Republic of China
 Huazhong University of Science and Technology
 Hubei College of Traditional Chinese Medicine
 Hubei Province Economic & Management Director University
 Hubei Provincial Education Commission 
 Hubei University 
 Internal Trade Ministry of China
 International Council of Adult Education
 Jianghan Petroleum Institute
 Jiangsu Association of Education and International Exchange 
 Jiangsu Education Commission
 Jiangsu Hospital of Traditional Chinese Medicine
 Jilin Clinic Medical Health Office
 Jilin Clinic Medical Health Office
 Jilin Hospital of Traditional Chinese Medicine
 Jilin Institute of Technology
 Jilin Province Communication School 
 Jilin Provincial Education Commission
 Jilin University 
 Jilin University of Technology 
 Jinling Vocational University  
 Nanhai Education Department  
 Nanjing Changjiang Lu Elementary School  
 Nanjing College of Traditional Chinese Medicine  
 Nanjing International Acupuncture Training Centre  
 Nanjing Normal University  
 Nanjing University of Traditional Chinese Medicine   
 National Office for Teaching Chinese as a Foreign Language  
 Office State Commission of Chinese Proficiency Test  
 Overseas Tidings Magazine  
 People's Congress of Guangzhou  
 PPCC of Shanxi Province  
 Shanghai Adult Education Committee  
 Shanghai Bureau of Higher Education   
 Shanghai Da Tong High School  
 Shanghai Education Association for International Exchange   
 Shanghai Exchange  
 Shanghai Fermented Foods Company  
   Shanghai Institute of Foreign Trade
   Shanghai Institute of Tourism
   Shanghai Municipal People's Government Education Commission
   Shanghai Second Polytechnic University
   Shanghai Teachers University
   Shanghai Textile College
   Shanghai University
   Shanghai University of Finance and Economics 
   Shanghai University of Traditional Chinese Medicine
   Shanghai Xuhui District Overseas Association 
   Shanghai Hua Guang Brewery Shanghai
   Shantou University
   Shanxi Education Commission
   Shanxi University
   Shenzhen Cable Broadcasting & CATV
   Shenzhen University
   Sichuan Province Education Commission
   Sichuan Union University
   South China University of Technology
   Southeast University 
   Southwestern University of Finance and Economics 
   State Administration of Traditional Chinese Medicine People's Republic of China
   State Education Commission
   Suzhou No.6 Middle School
   Taiyuan University of Technology
   Tongji University 
   University of Electronic Science and Technology China 
   University of International Business and Economics 
   Wuhan Car Industry University
   Wuhan Education Committee
   Wuhan Institute of Technology
   Wuhan Loja College of Foreign Language
   Wuhan University 
   Zhong Hui CPAs
   Zhongnan University of Finance and Economics

References

External links 
 
 British Chinese Heritage Centre website

Chinese community in the United Kingdom